The Hope Lutheran Church is a historic church at 310 S. 3rd Street in Westcliffe, Colorado. The building was designed and constructed in 1917 by Reverend John Reininga and was listed on the National Register of Historic Places in 1978.

It is built of hand-made concrete blocks, and the only ornamentation is brick quoins on the corners.

References

Lutheran churches in Colorado
Churches on the National Register of Historic Places in Colorado
Churches completed in 1917
Custer County, Colorado
National Register of Historic Places in Custer County, Colorado